The Director General of the Foreign Service is the designated manager of the United States Foreign Service. 

The Director General is a current or former Foreign Service Officer, appointed by the President, with the advice and consent of the United States Senate. Since November 23, 1975, under a Departmental administrative action, the Director General has concurrently held the title of Director of the Bureau of Global Talent Management. As the head of the human resources bureau, the Director General holds a rank equivalent to an Assistant Secretary of State and reports to the Under Secretary of State for Management. 

The current Director General is Marcia Bernicat.

History
Congress created the position of Director General of the Foreign Service through the Foreign Service Act of 1946. Between 1946 and 1980, the Secretary of State designated the Director General.

The Foreign Service Act of 1980 made the position a Presidential appointee.

After 1986, the Director General became responsible for all personnel aspects of the Foreign Service and the Civil Service at the State Department, including advertising, examination, appointment, job assignments worldwide, disciplinary actions, and promotions to the Senior Foreign Service.

List of directors general of the Foreign Service

References

1946 establishments in Washington, D.C.
 
Civil service in the United States